Brendan Patrick Rice (born March 11, 1997), better known by his stage name Gus Dapperton, is an American singer and songwriter from Warwick, New York.

History
Dapperton has received particular attention for his fashion style, consisting at some points of a green bowl cut, noticeable jewelry, eyeliner, brightly colored clothing, and thick-rimmed glasses.

Dapperton's song "Of Lacking Spectacle" was featured on the Netflix series 13 Reasons Why and appears on the soundtrack album.

Career

2016–17: "Moodna, Once With Grace" and Yellow and Such
Gus Dapperton released his debut single, "Moodna, Once With Grace", in 2016. In 2017, Dapperton released his debut EP, Yellow and Such.

2018: You Think You're A Comic!
In 2018, Dapperton released his second EP, You Think You're A Comic!.

2019: Where Polly People Go to Read
In 2019, Dapperton released his debut album, Where Polly People Go to Read. The album received positive reviews from critics.

2020–present: Orca
Dapperton's second studio album, Orca, was released on September 18, 2020. He released four singles, "First Aid", "Post Humorous", "Medicine", and "Bluebird", prior to the album's release. This album features only one artist other than Dapperton, Filipino Australian artist Chela on the track "My Say So", during the bridge and background vocals.

On April 7, 2021, Dapperton released a remix version of "Palms" as the album fifth single, featuring American rapper Channel Tres. The remix was included on the deluxe version of the album which was released on June 11, 2021. The deluxe version also includes three new songs: "Sober Up", "Flatline" and "Steady", in which the former was released as the sixth single of Orca era.

Personal life
Dapperton attended Drexel University, but took a semester off to go on tour in support of his 2018 EP You Think You're a Comic!.

Discography

Studio albums

Extended plays

Singles

As lead artist

As featured artist

Guest appearances

References

1997 births
Living people
American indie pop musicians
Songwriters from New York (state)
American synth-pop musicians
Synth-pop singers
Bedroom pop musicians